Mitcham Primary School is a South Australian State school serving the Mitcham area and situated on Hillview Road, Kingswood. It is the oldest continuously operating school in South Australia. It has an enrolment of approximately 766 students from Reception to Year 7 and an Out of School Hours Care Program.  The school predominantly serves the suburbs of Kingswood, Mitcham, Hawthorn, Netherby and Torrens Park. The school opened in 1847 with Thomas Mugg as the teacher in a hut on Mitcham Reserve. The school moved to the Mitcham Institute in 1870 and then to a purpose built school on Bulls Creek Road (Belair Road) in 1880. A new Primary school opened on the current site in Kingswood in 1953 and the Infant school and Primary came together on this site in 1981.

History
South Australia was first settled by colonists from Britain in 1836 and by the late '40s Adelaide was a thriving community, with Mitcham being a significant village a few miles to the south. A combined Chapel/School building was erected, paid for by subscription of local families, and opened as a school in 1847 with the teacher Thomas Mugg who had been a cabinet maker in London.  As attendance steadily increased the classroom became very crowded. Mugg continued as the teacher to 1868 teaching a very basic curriculum and enforcing strict discipline with regular use of a cane.

Growth

 At this time the community of South Australia was struggling with the problem of how to manage and extend public education in the colony. The Central Board of Education heard complaints about the quality of teachers in community run schools. Of 290 teachers supervised by the Board in 1875 only 135 were certificated as teachers. In 1875, the South Australian parliament passed the Education Act, establishing a public school system. All licensed schools such as Mitcham became Public Schools. The Act made schooling compulsory for children from 7 to 13 years (but not full-time).

The crowded conditions continued to 1880 when a new purpose built school was opened on Bulls Creek Road (now Belair Road). Three years later the Mitcham Railway Station was opened next to the school on the new  Adelaide-Aldgate line, creating with the school, a new centre of the Mitcham community. The close proximity of the school to the main Adelaide-Melbourne railway line entertained generations of children but severely restricted the expansion of the school grounds. The school continued to grow and enrolment was approximately 200 in 1900 and 200 by 1930.

In 2013 the Junior Primary and Primary schools were consolidated under one principal.

Head Masters/Principals

Notable students

References

External links
 Mitcham Primary School School website. Retrieved 3 June 2020.

Primary schools in South Australia